Exlex is a former Norwegian weekly satirical magazine, published from 1919 to 1920. It was edited by illustrator  Ragnvald Blix. Other contributors were illustrators Olaf Gulbransson, Anton Hansen, Adolf Hallman, Ossian Elgström and Robert Storm Petersen, and the poet Herman Wildenvey.

A total of ninety-six issues were published between February 1919 and December 1920.

References

1919 establishments in Norway
1920 disestablishments in Norway
Defunct magazines published in Norway
Magazines established in 1919
Magazines disestablished in 1920
Magazines published in Oslo
Norwegian-language magazines
Satirical magazines published in Norway
Weekly magazines published in Norway